Duris  may refer to:

 Duris, Lebanon, a village near Baalbek, Lebanon

People

Given name
 Duris of Samos (4th c. BC), at times Douris, philosopher, writer, and tyrant
 Duris (artist) (5th c. BC), Athenian potter and painter
 Duris Maxwell (born 1946), Canadian drummer

Surname
 Romain Duris (born 1974), French actor
 Peter Douris (born 1966), retired Canadian professional ice hockey player
 Miller M. Duris (1928–2014), American politician
 Michal Ďuriš (born 1988), Slovak footballer
 Peter Ďuriš (born 1981), Duris, or Durish
 Radoslav Ďuriš (born 1974), Slovak wheelchair curler, Paralympian
 Vítězslav Ďuriš (born 1954), professional ice hockey player

See also
 
 Douri, a surname
 Douris (disambiguation)
 Duri (disambiguation)